1940 presidential election may refer to:

 1940 Bolivian presidential election
 1940 Finnish presidential election
 1940 Mexican presidential election
 1940 United States presidential election